Eric Dunning (27 December 1936 – 10 February 2019) was a British sociologist who was Emeritus Professor of sociology at the University of Leicester.

Career
Eric Dunning was a pioneer in the sociology of sport and the founder, with Patrick Murphy and John Williams, of the Sir Norman Chester Centre for Football Research. He was the author of a number of books and articles on sport and the figurational sociology of Norbert Elias. Although officially retired, Dunning remained an Emeritus Professor of the University of Leicester as well as a Visiting Professor at the Chester Centre for Research into Sport and Society. Dunning was also a member of the editorial board of the Jornal de Ciências do Exercicio e Esporte, Paraná Federal University, Brazil.

Dunning had edited and co-authored numerous books in the sociology of sport. In 1999 he published his first sole-authored book, Sport Matters. In October 2000, he co-edited the comprehensive Handbook of Sports Studies with Jay Coakley. His book about Norbert Elias, Norbert Elias and Modern Sociology is based partly on Dunning's personal experience working with Elias for more than three decades. The book, co-authored with Jason Hughes, was published in 2012.

Dunning's supervised PhD students were Joseph Maguire, Dominic Malcolm, Martin Roderick, Yair Galily & Andy Smith.

Research interests
 sociological theory, especially the functional sociology and theory of civilizing processes of Norbert Elias and its place within the wider field of classical and modern sociology
 the sociology of sport and leisure
 problems of violence and civilization, especially sports-related violence such as football hooliganism
 the use of Elias's theory in understanding the Holocaust and genocide more generally.

Representative Publications

References

British sociologists
Academics of the University of Leicester
2019 deaths
1936 births